This is a list of museums in Venezuela.

 Aeronautics Museum of Maracay
 Children's Museum of Caracas
 Jesús Soto Museum of Modern Art
 Venezuelan Baseball Hall of Fame and Museum

See also 
 List of museums by country

Venezuela
 
Museums
Venezuela
Museums